This is a list of notable alumni and faculty of Saint Ignatius' College, Adelaide.

Armed Services 
 Major Leonard Roberts-Smith RFD QC, Order of Saint John - Judge Advocate General of the Australian Defence Force, Former Justice of the Supreme Court of Western Australia and Commissioner of the Corruption and Crime Commission of Western Australia..

Clergy 
 Gregory O'Kelly SJ - Bishop of Port Pirie.

Law 
 John Doyle ('62) - former Chief Justice of the Supreme Court of South Australia. 
 Martin Hinton SC - current South Australian Director of Public Prosecutions. 
 John Mansfield - former Justice of the Federal Court of Australia. 
 Major General Len Roberts-Smith - former justice of the Supreme Court of Western Australia. 
 Paul Rofe QC - former South Australian Director of Public Prosecutions (1992-2004). 
 Adam Kimber SC - former South Australian Director of Public Prosecutions (2012-2019). 
John E. Scanlon ('78) - Secretary General of CITES. 
 Mark Griffin QC ('74) - leading criminal barrister.

Media, Entertainment & the Arts 
 Benedict Andrews - theatre director. 
 Damon Gameau ('93) - actor, Balibo and Underbelly: A Tale of Two Cities .
 Ian Henschke - former ABC Stateline presenter; interviewed several participants in the Henry Keogh murder case. 
 Chris Kenny  - journalist, author, political adviser. 
 Christian Kerr - Crikey co-founder, The Australian senior reporter. 
 Hugh Sheridan - actor,  Packed to the Rafters. 
 James Coventry ('99) - ABC Radio Grandstand sports journalist and broadcaster. 
 Tom Rehn ('00) - Nine Network sports journalist and broadcaster. 
 Michael McGuire ('88) - author & The Advertiser journalist. 
 Rosanna Mangiarelli ('92) - Seven Network journalist and newsreader.
 Kim Polomka - (68) - renown artist muralist USA and Australia
 Thomas Patrick Haskell - ('13) - OnDit magazine editor and renown DJ artist

Academia, Medicine & Science 

 Professor John Warhurst - ANU Professor, AO - Emeritus Professor, Australian National University. Noted Australian - academic, prominent leader within the Australian Republican Movement. Formerly Professor of Political Science ANU 1993-2008 Author and political commentator.
 Elaine Bensted ('80) - current Chief Executive of Zoos SA.

Politics 
 Michael Armitage - (Lib) former MHA for Adelaide. 
 Martin Haese - former Lord Mayor of Adelaide. 
 Tom Kenyon - (Lab) former MHA for Newland. 
 Terence McRae - (Lab) former MHA for Playford; former Speaker of the House of Assembly. 
 Brendan Nelson - (Lib) former MHR for Bradfield; former Leader of the Opposition. 
 Christopher Pyne ('84) - (Lib) former MHR for Sturt.

Sport 
 Paul Baccanello - former professional tennis player
 Steven Baldas - former professional tennis player, and 1992 Wimbledon Championships – Boys' doubles Champion
 Daniel Beltrame - former Adelaide United goalkeeper
 Greg Gallman - Former Australian rules footballer for North Adelaide (SANFL) and the Adelaide Crows (AFL)
 Matthew Kelly - Former Australian rules footballer for Norwood (SANFL) and the Adelaide Crows (AFL)
 Jeanette Kieboom - Javelin, represented Australia at both the 1978 and 1986 Commonwealth Games
 Nicole Romeo - former Basketball player 
 Damien Nygaard - former Australian rules footballer for Norwood (SANFL), West Perth (WAFL) and South Australia (State)
 Taylor Ortlepp - basketball and AFLW player
 Kristian Rooke - Former Australian rules footballer for Norwood (SANFL)
 Tom Warhurst (74') - former Australian rules footballer for Norwood (SANFL) and the Adelaide Crows (AFL)
 Andrew Whiteman - former Australian rules footballer for Sturt (SANFL)

Rectors

Headmasters/Principals

Head of Senior School
 Mr P Coffey (2014-2017)
 Mr P Donato (2018-)

Head of Junior School
 Mr W Armitage (1992-2008)
 Mr S Fitzpatrick (2009-2017)
 Mr N Boys (2018-)

References

Saint Ignatius' College, Adelaide